Bab Hayyeh (also Romanized as Bāb Ḩayyeh; also known as Bābāhi, Bābhā’īyeh, Bābā Ḩayyeh, and Bābūyeh) is a village in Pa Qaleh Rural District, in the Central District of Shahr-e Babak County, Kerman Province, Iran. At the 2006 census, its population was 33, in 10 families.

References 

Populated places in Shahr-e Babak County